The Californians may refer to:

The Californians (TV series), American NBC 1950s western
"The Californians" (Dynasty), episode of TV show, Dynasty
"The Californians" (Saturday Night Live), soap opera parody of lifestyles and accents that first aired in 2012
The Californians (film), 2005 American independent drama adapted from Henry James' novel The Bostonians

See also
 The Californian (disambiguation), including several periodicals
 The Californias
 Californian (disambiguation)
 California (disambiguation)